This is a list of members of the Queensland Legislative Council from 1 January 1890 to 31 December 1899. Appointments, made by the Governor of Queensland, were for life, although many members for one reason or another resigned.

The chamber increased in size from 38 to 41 members on 23 August 1894.

Office bearers

President of the Legislative Council:
 Arthur Hunter Palmer (24 December 1881 – 20 March 1898)
 Hugh Nelson (13 April 1898 – 1 January 1906)

Chairman of Committees:
 Thomas Lodge Murray-Prior (31 July 1889 – 31 December 1892)
 Frederic Brentnall (26 May 1893 – 22 July 1902)

Members

 The following had served previous terms before the appointment indicated:
 Charles Hardie Buzacott: 21 January 1879 – 5 July 1882
 Boyd Dunlop Morehead: 31 December 1880 – 3 August 1883
 Albert Norton: 11 September 1867 – 29 May 1868

References

 Waterson, Duncan Bruce: Biographical Register of the Queensland Parliament 1860-1929 (second edition), Sydney 2001.
 Alphabetical Register of Members (Queensland Parliament)

Members of Queensland parliaments by term
19th-century Australian politicians